The Olympus PEN E-PL1 is a digital camera made by Olympus announced on 3 February 2010 and replaced in 2011. It was Olympus's third camera using the Micro Four Thirds system after the Olympus PEN E-P1 and Olympus PEN E-P2, and the first camera in Olympus' "PEN Lite" line.

Features
The PEN E-PL1 was the lowest-cost Micro Four Third camera available at launch, with a US dollar MSRP of $500.

In terms of market, DPReview considered the E-PL1 more aimed at the point-and-shoot (compact camera) market, rather than the DSLR market (like the E-P1 & E-P2) – more of a large-sensor compact than a small format DSLR. In DPReview's opinion the E-PL1 was easy to use in automatic mode, but due to the small number of dedicated dials and buttons, it could be more awkward to use in manual modes compared to a DSLR.

A slightly updated E-PL1s was introduced in November 2010. The E-PL1s offered increased maximum ISO sensitivity and shipped with a slightly higher capacity battery and an updated version of the kit 14-42mm lens.

Differences from E-P1/E-P2
 Built-in flash
 Support for VF-2 electronic viewfinder (over E-P1). VF-3 support with firmware update.
 Mono rather than stereo microphone.
 Direct movie record button.
 Simplified control scheme.
 No wireless/wired shutter release capability

Successor Model 

The E-PL1/E-PL1s were replaced in Olympus' PEN Lite line by the Olympus PEN E-PL2 which was announced in January 2011. The Olympus PEN E-PL3 was introduced in June 2011 and finally the Olympus PEN E-PL5 was introduced in September 2012. There was no E-PL4 in the line, as the number 4 is nearly homophonous to the word "death" and considered bad luck in Japanese culture.

References

External links

PEN E-PL1
Live-preview digital cameras
Cameras introduced in 2010